The House Small Business Subcommittee on Innovation, Entrepreneurship, and Workforce Development is one of five subcommittees of the United States House Committee on Small Business. It was previously known as the Subcommittee on Health and Technology.

Members, 117th Congress

Historical membership rosters

115th Congress

116th Congress

External links
House Committee on Small Business
House Small Business Committee Subcommittee page

Small Business Innovation